Peter Schumann (born 11 June 1934) is the co-founder and director of the Bread & Puppet Theater.  Born in Silesia, he was a sculptor and dancer in Germany before moving to the United States in 1961. In 1963 he founded Bread & Puppet in New York City, and in 1970 moved to the Northeast Kingdom of Vermont, eventually settling in Glover, Vermont, where the company still performs. Schumann's best known work is the Domestic Resurrection Circus, performed annually by the Bread and Puppet Theater until 1998. He was married to theater co-founder Elka Schumann until her passing in August 2021.

The Bread and Puppet Theater
Peter Schumann and his wife Elka co-founded the Bread and Puppet Theater in 1963 in New York City. The theater is named for its combination of puppetry shows with free freshly baked bread, generally served with a dipping sauce. The company is known, according to The Buffalo News for "anarchic, noncommercial, participatory and politically charged approach to art." Among the notable Bread and Puppet Theater shows directed by Schumann are "Nativity 1992", described by The New York Times as "an exemplar of performance folk art", and "The Divine Reality Comedy". He also participated in the Angry Arts week in January 1967.

The Domestic Resurrection Circus
After Bread & Puppet's first decade in New York City, Schumann decided to take an offer from Goddard College in Plainfield, Vermont, to become the college's first theater-in-residence. After a few years, Schumann composed his first Domestic Resurrection Circus. Blending vaudeville comedy with political commentary, as well as the company's trademark giant puppets, the Circus became a tradition each summer. After Schumann moved to Glover, Vermont, in 1973, the Circuses continued. The Domestic Resurrection Circus's last year was 1998, when over 30,000 people attended. Since then, a smaller circus is performed every weekend during the summer.

Palestine exhibits
In 2007 Schumann premiered "Independence Paintings: Inspired by Four Stories" in Boston and Burlington, Vermont. The series was inspired by ten days Schumann spent in the Occupied Territories of Palestine, as well as John Hersey's 'The Wall', a graphic account of the birth, development, and destruction of the Warsaw Ghetto, the largest of the Jewish ghettos established by Nazi Germany during the Jewish Holocaust. The series proved controversial, with critics labeling Schumann's works as "anti-Zionist", "anti-Semitic" and "soft-core Holocaust denial", accusations Schumann denied, stating that "I'm not saying that what's happening in Palestine is the same as what happened in Warsaw ... but it's certainly a reminder." While Schumann later acknowledged that he "may have unnecessarily hurt some people's feelings" with the series, he returned in 2008 to the theme of the Israeli–Palestinian conflict in his subsequent art series, "The University of Majd: The Story of a Palestinian Youth", which addresses a case of false imprisonment in Israel.

Published works

Puppen und Masken. Das Bread and Puppet Theater, Fischer, Frankfurt am Main/Germany, 1973.
The old art of puppetry in the new world order, 1993.
Bread: A lecture to art students at SUNY/Purchase, New York. 1987, reprint 1994.
Bread & Puppet. Green Man, 1996.

Further reading
Rehearsing With Gods: Photographs and Essays on the Bread and Puppet Theater, Ronald T. Simon and Marc Estrin, 2004.

External links
 Gallery of a Peter Schumann workshop at the 2007 Scenofest from Scenography
 Bread & Puppet website

References 

1934 births
Living people
German emigrants to the United States
People from the Province of Lower Silesia
People from Orleans County, Vermont
American theatre directors
American puppeteers